Fredrick Orlando "Fred" Trautman (March 24, 1892 – February 15, 1964) was a Major League Baseball pitcher, who appeared in one game for the 1915 Newark Peppers of the defunct Federal League. Trautman was born in Bucyrus, Ohio and died there in 1964.

References

External links
Baseball-Reference.com

1964 deaths
1892 births
Baseball players from Ohio
Newark Peppers players
Marion Orphans players
Ironton Diggers players
Ironton Nailers players
Springfield Reapers players
Hartford Senators players
People from Bucyrus, Ohio